Eva Henriette Gottwein is a virologist and Associate Professor of Microbiology-Immunology at Northwestern University Feinberg School of Medicine in Chicago, Illinois.  The main focus of her research is the role of viral miRNAs involved in herpesviral oncogenesis. Gottwein is member of Robert H. Lurie Comprehensive Cancer Center of Northwestern University. Her contributions as a member include the focus on how encoded miRNAs target and function in the human oncogenic herpesvirus Kaposi's sarcoma-associated herpesvirus known as KSHV.

Education and career
Gottwein received her PhD in biology from Heidelberg University in 2005.
During her postdoctoral work, Eva Gottwein studied herpesviral miRNA in Bryan Cullen's laboratory at Duke University. Eva Gottwein currently is an associate  professor of microbiology-immunology at Northwestern University Feinberg School of Medicine.

Research contributions
The focus of her work involves identifying the function of microRNAs that are encoded in the human herpesvirus Kaposi's sarcoma-associated herpesvirus (KSHV). KSHV causes tumors by infecting endothelial cells. Since the AIDS epidemic in Africa, KSHV is also known to attack and infect B lymphocytes, which results in a person having  B cell lymphomas and effusion lymphoma. Prior to her laboratory experience at Duke University, the target for KSHV microRNAs were unknown. Gottwein recently studied the expression of KSHV mRNAs.  Through her research she found that Kaposi's sarcoma-associated herpesvirus (KSHV) has nearly 20 viral mRNAs. During her research she discovered that miR-K10 by itself has the ability to transform cells. In another experiment, Gottwein research found that the function of miRNA KSHV proteins that were used to target certain cellular RNAs. Through her experiment she discovered abnormal ligand reactions that occurred during the absence of exogenous ligase and a unique miRNA binding site. Her goal for the next few years is to learn more about the targetome of the KSHV microRNAs and identification of the virus' functions in oncogenesis.

Notable publications

References

Year of birth missing (living people)
Living people
American virologists
Northwestern University faculty
Heidelberg University alumni